A Killing Affair is a drama film starring Peter Weller, Kathy Baker, John Glover, Bill Smitrovich and Danny Nelson. The film was written and directed by David Saperstein (Cocoon).

Plot
During World War II, an outsider, Baston Morris (Weller), comes to a tiny town looking for work at the local mill. He meets up with the town's evil employer, Pink Gresham (Smitrovich), who abuses the men and has affairs with the women. Pink toys with Baston's plight but keeps the upper hand with his pistol and chases Baston away.

Baston then meets Pink's wife, Maggie (Baker), and spins a tale of her husband's philandering and Pink's personal involvement with Baston's affairs at his hometown in the next county.

The subplot contains stories of Maggie's brother, Shep Sheppard, (Glover) who is a fundamentalist preacher that has followed his father's misogynistic ways. Sheppard sides with Pink when it comes to laying down the law, and a hunt ensues for Baston after stories are revealed of him being an axe murderer.

Production
This film was based on the novel Monday, Tuesday, Wednesday by Robert Houston.

It was filmed in Juliette, Georgia. The film takes place in West Virginia.

Despite being completed in 1985, the film did not find a distributor in the US until the following year and was not released until 1988. The film was released in the UK as My Sister's Keeper.

References

External links

 
 

1986 films
1986 crime drama films
Adultery in films
American crime drama films
Films based on American novels
Films set in the 1940s
Films set in West Virginia
Films set on the home front during World War II
Films shot in Georgia (U.S. state)
Films scored by John Barry (composer)
1988 drama films
1988 films
1980s English-language films
1980s American films